Emirates SkyCargo operates dedicated cargo flights to countries across Africa, Asia, Australia, Europe and the Americas from its hub at Al Maktoum International Airport.

The airline also has scheduled cargo flights to 9 destinations, which do not receive service from Emirates passenger aircraft, namely: Djibouti, Eldoret, Guadalajara, Hanoi, Liège, Lilongwe, Ouagadougou, Quito and Zaragoza. Additionally Emirates SkyCargo manages the cargo holds of all Emirates passenger aircraft, the company offers cargo product services to all destinations on the Emirates passenger network.

List

This is a list of cities Emirates SkyCargo flies to ( as of March 2020 ). SkyCargo previously also operated freighter aircraft to a number of destinations that were common with Emirates passenger network, therefore only exclusive cargo stations have been listed here as terminated routes.

Note: .1 Liège and New York City were previously operated by Emirates own aircraft and now served through block space agreement on ASL Airlines Belgium.

References

External links
Emirates SkyCargo

SkyCargo
Lists of airline destinations